Kurds in Japan (Japanese: 在日クルド人, Zainichi Kurudo-jin, Kurdish: Kurdên Japonyayê) refers to Kurds residing in Japan.

Legal status
Most Kurds in Japan are from shepherding villages in Southeast Turkey and reside in the Warabi and Kawaguchi areas of Saitama Prefecture, north of Tokyo. Warabi, especially, has been nicknamed "Warabistan" by those who are interested in Kurdish people, culture and issues.

Some Kurdish people arrived in Japan in order to request refugee status; citing human rights abuses in Turkey and Iraq. Nonetheless, so far none have been successful in their application due to Japan's asylum system.  While many obtain visas through marriage with a Japanese citizen, most have obtained "Special Permission to Stay" (在留特別許可 Zairyū Tokubetsu Kyoka) visas, which must be renewed every three months while their refugee application or appeal is being reviewed. A documentary directed by Masaru Nomoto (野本 大) entitled Backdrop Kurdistan (バックドロップ・クルディスタン) documented the legal struggles of one Kurdish family (Kazankıran family: Japanese: カザンキラン, Kazankiran) from Kahramanmaraş Province.

In 2015, a clash took place outside the Turkish embassy in Tokyo between Kurds and Turks in Japan during early voting for the Turkish general election. Japanese and Kurdish sources claimed the clash began when the Turks assaulted the Kurds after a Kurdish party flag was shown at the embassy.

See also
Kurdish diaspora
Turks in Japan

References

External links
Newroz New Year celebration in Japan

Ethnic groups in Japan
Kurdish diaspora